Feat or FEAT may refer to:

 FEAT (album), a 2012 The Hood Internet album
 Feat (d20 System), concept in role-playing game system d20
 Feat (stato di natura), a 2020 album by Francesca Michielin
 An abbreviation for featuring, used in credit lists to indicate a guest appearance (common in music)
 Far Eastern Air Transport
 FEAT Stiftung (Foundation for Exceptional Abilities and Talents)

See also
 Feats, English reputed sorcerer